The solo discography of Finnish singer, songwriter and musician Ville Valo consists of one studio album, one collaboration album, one extended play, ten singles and four music videos. He has also made several guest appearances on other artists' releases.

Valo began his career in the early 1990s playing in several local bands around Helsinki, Finland. In 1991, he formed HIM, which would go on to become one of the most successful Finnish bands of all time. HIM released eight studio albums over the course of its career, before disbanding in 2017. Valo was also a member of Daniel Lioneye, a side project formed by Valo along with fellow HIM members Linde Lindström and Mige.

Concurrent to his career in HIM, Valo made several guest appearances on releases by other artists, including The 69 Eyes, Anathema, Andy McCoy, Apocalyptica, Bloodhound Gang, Cradle of Filth, Jeff Walker, Lullacry, MGT, The Mission and Tehosekoitin. In 2007, Valo and German actress-singer Natalia Avelon released a cover version of Lee Hazlewood's "Summer Wine", which charted at number one in Finland and Greece, as well as number two in Germany and Switzerland. The single was later certified platinum in Finland and Germany. In 2016, Valo released a cover version of "Olet mun kaikuluotain" (a Finnish version of John Denver's "Annie's Song") to celebrate the 50th anniversary of Love Records. The single reached number one on the Finnish Digital Song Sales Chart. 

In 2018, Valo teamed up with Finnish schlager group Agents to record songs by late Finnish singer-songwriter Rauli "Badding" Somerjoki. Valo had previously worked with the group in 1999, when he appeared as guest vocalist on the television show Laulava sydän. Ville Valo & Agents released their self-titled album on 15 February 2019. It debuted at number one on the Finnish Albums Chart and was certified gold in less than a week. In 2020, Valo embarked on a solo career with the release of the EP Gothica Fennica Vol. 1, which was released under the moniker VV. Two of its three tracks charted on the Finnish Radio Airplay Chart. In April 2022, Valo released "Loveletting", the first single from his debut solo album. Neon Noir was released on 13 January 2023 and it charted in six countries, debuting at number one in Finland and number four in Germany.

Albums

Studio albums

Collaboration albums

EPs

Singles

As lead artist

As a featured artist

Notes

 Peaked on the Finnish Digital Song Sales Chart
 Peaked on the Finnish Radio Airplay Chart

Music videos

As lead artist

As a featured artist

Other appearances

Release contributions

Guest appearances

References

Footnotes

Book sources 

Discographies of Finnish artists